= Rasovac, Tuzla =

Village in Bosnia and Herzegovina

Rasovac
- Village
- Location within Bosnia and Herzegovina
- Coordinates: 44.571777°N 18.6488204°E
- Country: Bosnia and Herzegovina
- Entity: Federation of Bosnia and Herzegovina
- Canton: Tuzla
- Municipality: Tuzla

Area
  - Total: 1.44 sq mi (3.74 km^{2})

Population (2013)
  - Total: 134
  - Density: 92.8/sq mi (35.8/km^{2})
- Time zone: UTC+1 (CET)
  - Summer (DST): UTC+2 (CEST)

Rasovac is a village in the municipality of Tuzla, Tuzla Canton, Bosnia and Herzegovina.

== Demographics ==
According to the 2013 census, its population was 134.

Ethnicity in 2013
Ethnicity	Number	Percentage
Bosniaks	118	88.1%
Croats	3	2.2%
other/undeclared	13	9.7%
Total	134	100%
